Blues Hoot (also released as Coffee House Blues) is a live album by blues musicians Lightnin' Hopkins, Brownie McGhee, and Sonny Terry recorded at the Ash Grove in Los Angeles in 1961 and originally released on the Davon label before being reissued by Horizon Records in 1963 and Vee-Jay Records in 1965.

Reception

AllMusic reviewer Bruce Eder stated: "Lightnin' Hopkins is the star of this live recording ... The sound is excellent, the performances are spirited enough ... It is difficult to say, however, anything distinguishes this set from the other folk club recordings that Hopkins, Terry and McGhee left behind on other labels".

Track listing
All compositions by Sam "Lightnin'" Hopkins except where noted
 Introduction – 1:45
 "Big Car Blues" – 3:03
 "Coffee House Blues" – 2:01
 "Stool Pigeon Blues" – 3:04
 "Ball of Twine" – 2:52
 "Blues for Gamblers" (Traditional) – 6:42
 "Walk On" (Brownie McGhee, Ruth McGhee) – 2:50
 "Blues for Lowlands" (Brownie McGhee, Sonny Terry) – 	4:50
 "Down by the Riverside" (Traditional) – 3:17
 "Blowin' the Fuses" (McGhee, Terry) –	5:55
 "Right On That Shore" (Traditional) – 2:50

Personnel

Performance
Lightnin' Hopkins – guitar, vocals (tracks 1–6 & 11)
Brownie McGhee – guitar, vocals (tracks 7–11)
Sonny Terry – harmonica, vocals (tracks 7–11)
Big Joe Williams – guitar, vocals (track 6)

References

1961 live albums
Lightnin' Hopkins live albums
Brownie McGhee albums
Sonny Terry albums
Horizon Records live albums
Vee-Jay Records live albums